Raja Swarup Singh Bundela was the fort commander of Gingee Fort in Tamil Nadu, India from 1700  until his death in 1714.

Background

The Mughal Empire defeated the Maratha Empire at Gingee in February 1698.

In return for military services, the Mughal Emperor Aurangzeb, granted a mansab rank of 2,500 and jagir land grant of 12 lakhs (1,200,000) to Raja Swarup Singh, a Bundela Rajput chieftain, along with the kiladari (Fort Commandership) of Gingee in 1700 AD.

References

1714 deaths
Villupuram District